Banarhat Kartik Oraon Hindi Government College, established in 2014, is the government degree college in Banarhat,  Jalpaiguri district. It is the first Hindi medium government college in West Bengal. It offers undergraduate courses in science and arts. It is affiliated to University of North Bengal.

See also

References

External links
University of North Bengal
University Grants Commission
National Assessment and Accreditation Council

Universities and colleges in Jalpaiguri district
Colleges affiliated to University of North Bengal
Educational institutions established in 2014
2014 establishments in West Bengal